Kʼukʼ Bahlam I, also known as Kuk and Bahlum Kʼukʼ, (March 30, 397 – 435?), was a founder and ajaw of the ruling dynasty at the Maya city of Palenque. He founded the dynasty on March 10, 431.

Depiction 
One stone censer stand portrays one of the Palenque kings named Kʼukʼ Bahlam, as the subject can be identified by a quetzal (kʼuk''') headdress and jaguar (bahlam'') ears.

Notes

Sources 

397 births
Rulers of Palenque
5th-century monarchs in North America
Year of death unknown
5th century in the Maya civilization